The Pacific footballfish (Himantolophus sagamius) is a species found in the Pacific. It has a wide range, extending from the coasts of Honshu (Gulf of Sagami) and Hokkaido islands through the Kuril-Kamchatka trough, in the northwest Pacific, to the eastern Pacific from California to Peru.

See also 
 Bathyal zone

References

Fish of the Pacific Ocean
Himantolophidae
Deep sea fish